The Sarasota Classic was a golf tournament on the LPGA Tour from 1976 to 1988. It was played at Bent Tree Country Club in Sarasota, Florida.

Winners
Sarasota Classic
1988 Patty Sheehan
1987 Nancy Lopez
1986 Patty Sheehan
1985 Patty Sheehan
1984 Alice Miller
1983 Donna White

Bent Tree Ladies Classic
1982 Beth Daniel
1981 Amy Alcott
1980 JoAnne Carner

Bent Tree Classic
1979 Sally Little
1978 Nancy Lopez
1977 Judy Rankin
1976 Kathy Whitworth

References

External links
Bent Tree Country Club

Former LPGA Tour events
Golf in Florida
Recurring sporting events established in 1976
Recurring sporting events disestablished in 1988
1976 establishments in Florida
1988 disestablishments in Florida
Women's sports in Florida